The Château de Castelnaud is a medieval fortress in the commune of Castelnaud-la-Chapelle, overlooking the river Dordogne in Périgord, southern France. It was erected to face its rival, the Château de Beynac.

History
The oldest documents mentioning it date to the 13th century, when it figured in the Albigensian Crusade; its Cathar castellan was Bernard de Casnac. Simon de Montfort took the castle and installed a garrison; when it was retaken by Bernard, he hanged them all. During the Hundred Years' War, the castellans of Castelnaud owed their allegiance to the Plantagenets, the sieurs de Beynac across the river, to the king of France. In later times it was abandoned bit by bit, until by the French Revolution it was a ruin.

The château today
Today the picturesquely restored castle, a private property open to the public, houses a much-visited museum of medieval warfare, featuring reconstructions of siege engines, mangonneaux, and trebuchets. The castle is listed as a monument historique by the French Ministry of Culture.

See also

 Château des Milandes, also in Castelnaud-la-Chapelle
 List of castles in France

References

External links

 English Website of Château de Castelnaud
 Château de Castelnaud
 

Castles in Nouvelle-Aquitaine
Châteaux in Dordogne
Monuments historiques of Dordogne
Historic house museums in Nouvelle-Aquitaine
Military and war museums in France
Museums in Dordogne